Necropolis of Love was a new wave/synthpop band which formed in 1981 in Berkeley, California.

The group was often categorized as gothic rock or new wave; however, in a conversation with the prominent musician Iggy Pop, Necropolis of Love band member David Velasquez described the band's sound as "hostile disco music".

Discography
 In Search Of... 12" EP (1983, Thumb Records)
 The Hope 12" EP (1984, Thumb Records)

Singles
 "Talk" (1982, Thumb Records)

References

External links
 Myspace page    
 Discogs entry.

Musical groups established in 1981
American new wave musical groups
Musical groups from California